Muhammad Masihullah Khan Sherwani Jalalabadi (Muḥammad Masīhu’llāh Khān Shīrwānī Jalāl ābādī; 1911/1912 – 12 November 1992) was an Indian Deobandi Islamic scholar known as an authority in Sufism. He was among the senior khalifahs of Ashraf Ali Thanvi, who gave him the title "Masih al-Ummah" ("Comforter of the Ummah").

Early life
Muhammad Masihullah Khan was born in 1329 or 1330 AH (1911/1912) in Sara’i Barla, a village in the Aligarh district of Uttar Pradesh, India. His family was of the Sherwani tribe, a Sayyid tribe of Pathans. His father's name was Ahmad Sa`id Khan.
Masihullah was known for piety in his youth, and he often sat in the company of scholars and Sufis. He developed a close companionship with Muhammad Ilyas Kandhalvi, who introduced him to the books and lectures of Ashraf Ali Thanvi.

Education and training
Most of Masihullah's Islamic education was undertaken in his hometown under Sa`id Ahmad Lucknowi. He then enrolled in Darul Uloom Deoband in 1347 AH (1928/1929). In the same year he pledged allegiance to Ashraf Ali Thanvi. At Darul Uloom Deoband, Masihullah's teachers included Husain Ahmad Madani, Muhammad I'zaz Ali Amrohi, 
Syed Mian Asghar Hussain Deobandi, and Muhammad Ibrahim Baliyawi.
Masihullah graduated in Sha`ban 1351 AH (1932). On 25 Shawwal 1351 (February 1933), he was granted khilafah by Thanvi, his shaykh, and was thus authorized to take his own disciples. Despite Masihullah's young age, Thanvi listed him among his eleven most distinguished khalifahs (spiritual representatives). In fact, he was ranked second among those eleven  most distinguished khalifahs, ranking only below Professor Mawlana Muhammad 'Isa Allahabadi, who was the most senior disciple of Mawlana Thanwi.   Thanwi had confidence in Masihullah's methods of spiritual training, and would sometimes refer disciples to Masihullah for training.
Mufti Muhammad Taqi Usmani is one of his  most distinguished khalifahs.

Jalalabad
Upon the direction of Thanvi, in 1357 AH (1938/1939) Masihullah moved to the town of Jalalabad in the district of Muzaffarnagar, due to the need for a teacher there. In Jalalabad, Masihullah took charge of a small, two-roomed school known as Madrasah Miftah al-`Ulum. Within thirty years the school developed from a simple maktab into a large madrasah with Islamic education offered from the elementary level up to the Alimiyah and Ifta levels.
In 1407 AH (1986/1987), Masihullah gave the responsibility for running the madrasah to his son so that he could devote more time to his khanqah, where an increasingly large number of people were coming for spiritual reformation. Every Monday and Thursday, Masihullah would conduct a two- to three-hour gathering for instructing his disciples. Every Friday, after the prayer, he would have a gathering for the general public which would be attended by several hundred people from Jalalabad and the surrounding areas.

Literary works
 Shariat-o-Tasawwuf
The Path to Perfection

Demise
Masihullah died on 12 November 1992. He was buried the next day after the Friday prayer. The funeral prayer was led by Mufti Inayatullah, and his funeral was attended by over 250,000 people. He was buried in the cemetery next to the madrasah.

References

Year of birth uncertain
1992 deaths
Indian Sunni Muslim scholars of Islam
Hanafi fiqh scholars
Indian Sufis
Sunni Sufis
People from Aligarh
Deobandis
Indian people of Pashtun descent
Disciples of Ashraf Ali Thanwi